Nastja Govejšek is a Slovenian swimmer.  Govejšek was born 15 July 1997 in Slovenia. At the 2012 Summer Olympics, she competed in the Women's 100 metre freestyle, finishing in 28th place overall in the heats, failing to qualify for the semifinals.

References

Slovenian female swimmers
Living people
Olympic swimmers of Slovenia
Swimmers at the 2012 Summer Olympics
Slovenian female freestyle swimmers
1997 births
Swimmers at the 2014 Summer Youth Olympics